Roland Pederson (born April 1950) is an American politician from the U.S. state of Oklahoma. He currently serves in the Oklahoma Senate, representing the 19th district, as a Republican.

References

Republican Party Oklahoma state senators
1950 births
Living people
People from Alfalfa County, Oklahoma
21st-century American politicians